Tundi Assembly constituency   is an assembly constituency in  the Indian state of Jharkhand.

Members of Assembly

Election Results

2019

See also
Vidhan Sabha
List of states of India by type of legislature

References

Assembly constituencies of Jharkhand